František Čermák and Michal Mertiňák were the defending champions, but they decided to not compete this year.

Seeds

Draw

Draw

References
 Doubles Draw

Romanian Open
Bcr Open Romania - Doubles